The following is a list of territorial disputes between two or more local government units over an area in the Philippines. Section 118 of the Local Government Code of the Philippines provides mechanism to resolve boundary disputes among barangays, municipalities, cities, and provinces.

Unresolved disputes

Past disputes

References